The SJ Class T46 is a diesel-electric locomotive used by Malmtrafik for shunting at Kiruna in Sweden. Four locomotives were built by Nyquist & Holm (NOHAB) as upgrades versions of T44 in 1973–74. The T46 features more powerful engines and six, Co′Co′, instead of four axles. It is the most powerful diesel locomotive used in Sweden. The locomotives are still in use, and three of the engines were supposed to be upgraded in 2007, but the company that was rebuilding them went bankrupt. LKAB's own workshops at Notviken are rebuilding them instead.

NOHAB locomotives
Diesel-electric locomotives of Sweden
Co′Co′ locomotives
Iron Ore Line
Railway locomotives introduced in 1973
Standard gauge locomotives of Sweden